Pierre Souquès (2 January 1910, Paris - 10 April 2007) was a French politician. He represented the Radical Party in the National Assembly from 1951 to 1958.

References

1910 births
2007 deaths
Politicians from Paris
Radical Party (France) politicians
Deputies of the 2nd National Assembly of the French Fourth Republic
Deputies of the 3rd National Assembly of the French Fourth Republic
French military personnel of World War II
French Resistance members